The Agrzhan were a group of primarily Muslim merchants from India who operated in Astrakhan. In 1857, they numbered 107. Since then they have assimilated into the Astrakhan Tatar population.

At least some of the earliest Agrzhan were Hindus. They were closely connected with the Bukharan merchants in Astrakhan, and part of the trade network connecting Astrakhan with Bukhara and Iran before and after the Russian conquest of the city. Over time, they all became Muslims. They retained special privileges, as well as the so-called Gilani Tatars, the Iranian trading community in the city, and with the cities Bukharan Tatars, until 1836.

Sources

Wixman, Ronald. The Peoples of the USSR: An Ethnographic Handbook. (Armonk, New York: M. E. Sharpe, Inc, 1984) p. 6

Ethnic groups in Russia
Hinduism in Russia
Islam in Russia
Astrakhan
Russian people of Indian descent